Matthew Spencer Clempner (born 20 May 1956) is a British wrestler. He competed in the men's freestyle +100 kg at the 1980 Summer Olympics.

Personal life
Clempner ran the Bolton Judokwai in the Horwich Leisure Centre and was the UK Judo North West area technical director. His son Matt Clempner is a three times champion of Great Britain, winning the heavyweight division at the British Judo Championships in 2007, 2011 and 2012.

References

External links
 

1956 births
Living people
British male sport wrestlers
Olympic wrestlers of Great Britain
Wrestlers at the 1980 Summer Olympics
Sportspeople from Salford